Forest Hill Cemetery is located in Madison, Wisconsin, and was one of the first U.S. National Cemeteries established in Wisconsin.

Founding of cemetery
After the first permanent European-American settlers arrived in Madison in the 1830s, the first non-native burials occurred on the current University of Wisconsin–Madison campus, near Bascom Hill. In the following years other areas within the area were established as informal burying grounds and the first official village cemetery was established in 1847 near what is now Orton Park.

In the mid-1850s, a committee was formed to search for another appropriate site in the area to form an official Madison cemetery. The committee members chose the current site, then on the far west side of the city and subsequently bought the original  of land for $10,000 from John and Mary Wright. The Wrights had obtained the land from land speculator James Duane Doty, who had obtained it from Alanson Sweet, a territorial council member from Milwaukee.

In 1863 the city sold a portion of land from the original purchase to the Roman Catholic Societies for $170. They in turn developed that property into a Catholic cemetery, now known as Resurrection Cemetery.

In the 1860s a receiving vault was built on site. During and following the Civil War, the Soldiers Lot and Confederate Lot were created and in 1865 a well was dug near the plot of Governor Harvey and a windmill was erected over it. In 1878 a chapel was built following a contribution by the family of John Catlin.

Expansion
In 1928 another  were purchased, 60 of which are part of the Glenway Golf Course directly behind the present cemetery.

Effigy mounds

The cemetery protects seven precontact effigy mounds, dating from 700 to 1200 CE. The earthworks are shaped like a goose flying down a slope toward Lake Wingra, two panthers, and a linear shape. Three more linear mounds have been destroyed by cemetery development and the goose's head was destroyed by grading for the railroad. The mound group is listed on the National Register of Historic Places in 1974.

Confederate Rest

A section of the cemetery is known as Confederate Rest. On it lie about 140 Confederate prisoners of war who died while in confinement in a Union camp in Madison, Camp Randall, in 1862.  A stone marker or cenotaph lists the names of 132 of the prisoners who died in custody. In October 2018, the Madison City Council voted 16 to 2 to remove the marker with the list of buried prisoners, overturning the Landmarks Commission, which had denied a permit to remove the marker, which was built in 1906. The eradication of the cenotaph was seen by some in city government as a "reparation," and was supported by the Equal Opportunities Commission of the city government.

The removal of the cenotaph was opposed by the Dane County Historical Society. The editorial board of the Wisconsin State Journal, noting Confederate Rest is the northernmost Confederate graveyard in the nation, also opposed the removal.

Notable interments
 Henry Cullen Adams (died 1906), member of the U.S. House of Representatives
 David Atwood (died 1889), member of the U.S. House of Representatives
 Theodore W. Brazeau (died 1965), member of the Wisconsin State Senate and lawyer
 Romanzo Bunn (died 1909), United States district judge for the Western District of Wisconsin
 John B. Cassoday (died 1907), 9th Chief Justice of the Wisconsin Supreme Court, 27th Speaker of the Wisconsin State Assembly
 Orsamus Cole (died 1903), 4th Chief Justice of the Wisconsin Supreme Court
 Roland B. Day (died 2008), 22nd Chief Justice of the Wisconsin Supreme Court
 Luther S. Dixon (died 1891), 2nd Chief Justice of the Wisconsin Supreme Court
 Lyman C. Draper (died 1891), 5th Wisconsin Superintendent of Public Instruction, secretary of the Wisconsin Historical Society
 Ben C. Eastman (died 1856), member of the U.S. House of Representatives
 Cassius Fairchild (died 1868), Union Army officer, wounded at Shiloh, member of the Wisconsin State Assembly
 Jairus C. Fairchild (died 1862), first State Treasurer of Wisconsin, first Mayor of Madison
 Lucius Fairchild (died 1896), 10th Governor of Wisconsin, U.S. Minister to Spain, Union Army officer, wounded at Gettysburg
 Frank L. Gilbert (died 1930), 19th Attorney General of Wisconsin
 Charles R. Gill (died 1883), 9th Attorney General of Wisconsin, Union Army officer
 Louis P. Harvey (died 1862), 7th Governor of Wisconsin, died in office
 Nils P. Haugen (1849–1931), U.S. Representative from Wisconsin
 Nathan Heffernan (died 2007), 21st Chief Justice of the Wisconsin Supreme Court
 Benjamin F. Hopkins (died 1870), member of the U.S. House of Representatives, died in office
 James C. Hopkins (died 1877), United States district judge for the Western District of Wisconsin
 John Wayles Jefferson (died 1892), Union Army officer, grandson of Sally Hemings and (likely) Thomas Jefferson
 Eston Hemings Jefferson (died 1856), Son of Sally Hemings and Thomas Jefferson
 Burr W. Jones (died 1935), Justice of the Wisconsin Supreme Court, member of the U.S. House of Representatives
 Belle Case La Follette (died 1931), activist for Women's suffrage, peace, and civil rights. Wife of Governor Robert M. La Follette, Sr.
 Philip La Follette (died 1965), 27th and 29th Governor of Wisconsin, co-founder of the Wisconsin Progressive Party
 Robert M. La Follette, Jr., (died 1953) United States Senator, co-founder of the Wisconsin Progressive Party
 Robert M. La Follette, Sr., (died 1925) 20th Governor of Wisconsin, United States Senator, founder of the Progressive Party, candidate for President of the United States in 1924
 Alexander S. McDill (1822–1875), physician and U.S. congressman
 John M. Nelson (1870–1955), U.S. Representative from Wisconsin
 Phyllis Ntantala-Jordan (died 2016), South African anti-apartheid activist and author
 Byron Paine (died 1871), Justice of the Wisconsin Supreme Court, as a lawyer he successfully argued the 1866 case of Gillespie v. Palmer which established voting rights in Wisconsin for African Americans
 Silas U. Pinney (died 1899), mayor of Madison, 1874–76, justice of the Wisconsin Supreme Court, 1892–98
 Frederic E. Risser (died 1971) Wisconsin state senator
 Alden Sprague Sanborn (died 1885), 7th mayor of Madison
 Arthur Loomis Sanborn (died 1920), United States District Judge for the Western District of Wisconsin
 Harry Sauthoff (1849–1966), lawyer, Wisconsin state senator, and U.S. Representative from Wisconsin
 Robert G. Siebecker (died 1922), 9th Chief Justice of the Wisconsin Supreme Court, died in office
 George Baldwin Smith (died 1879), 4th Attorney General of Wisconsin, 3rd and 16th Mayor of Madison
 John Coit Spooner (1843–1919), Wisconsin state assemblyman and U.S. Senator from Wisconsin
 William Robert Taylor (died 1909), 12th Governor of Wisconsin
 William Freeman Vilas (1840–1908), U.S. Senator, U.S. Secretary of the Interior and Postmaster General
 Aad J. Vinje (died 1929), 10th Chief Justice of the Wisconsin Supreme Court, died in office
 Ernest Warner (died 1930), Wisconsin legislator, namesake of Madison's Warner Park
 Thomas T. Whittlesey (1798–1868), U.S. Representative from Connecticut
 Emmert L. Wingert (died 1971), Wisconsin Supreme Court Justice

Notes

References

External links
 
 
 Forest Hill Cemetery: A Guide – An introduction to various aspects of the cemetery, including its history and ecology; the symbols used on gravestones and the geology of those stones; the religious traditions and rituals represented; the effigy mounds constructed on the site long before it became a modern cemetery; and the geography and business of death.
 

Cemeteries in Wisconsin
Geography of Madison, Wisconsin
Historic American Landscapes Survey in Wisconsin
Tourist attractions in Madison, Wisconsin
Protected areas of Dane County, Wisconsin